Grapholita decolorana is a species of moth of the family Tortricidae. It is found in Australia, where it has been recorded from New South Wales.

Moths described in 1863
Grapholitini